Aurel Vlaicu University of Arad is a public university founded in 1990 in Arad, Romania. It was named in honor of the  Romanian engineer and aviation pioneer Aurel Vlaicu.

Overview
Started in 1972, as the Arad Institute of Sub-Engineers, the institution was accredited on 18 May 1990 to grant university degrees. Over the years, Aurel Vlaicu University has developed new specializations, with new faculties, which meet the terms of quality standards. The 2009–10 academic year marks the establishment of the Faculty of Design and the specializations: psychology, computer science, economics, marketing, and fashion and fashion design. Thus at the beginning of academic year UAV has 9 departments, 38 specialties license, 19 master's programs, field IOSUD (Institution organizing PhD studies) in Philology, and 12 departments.

A fundamental dimension of higher education is the scientific research. In the 2008–09 academic year scientific research accelerated in comparison with previous years. In 2008 UAV participated in 9 international research projects and 7 national research projects. Of these, 8 international projects and 5 international projects won. The value of research contracts funded by the national competition was 2,027,202 RON and of the international projects was US$52,350."Rector’s speech to the opening of the academic year 2009-2010

In 2013, the Romanian Agency for Quality Assurance in Higher Education, ARACIS, granted „Aurel Vlaicu” University of Arad a „Limited degree of confidence”.

Faculties
 Faculty of Design
 Faculty of Economic Sciences
 Faculty of Exact Sciences
 Faculty of Humanities and Social Sciences
 Faculty of Educational Sciences, Psychology and Social Sciences
 Faculty of Theology
 Faculty of Engineering
 Faculty of Food Engineering, Tourism and Environmental Protection
 Faculty of Physical Education and Sport

References

 Rector’s speech to the opening of the academic year 2009-2010
http://www.aracis.ro/uploads/media/Raport_Consiliu_1.pdf (ARACIS's decision for the "Limited degree of confidence" rating)

External links
 Official website
 Top of Romanian Universities - 2007 (in Romanian)
Accreditation of Aurel Vlaicu University (in Romanian)
 Universitatea Aurel Vlaicu din Arad (in ro.Wikipedia)

Aurel Vlaicu University of Arad
Educational institutions established in 1972
1972 establishments in Romania
Educational institutions established in 1990
1990 establishments in Romania